The Prometheus Award is an award for libertarian science fiction novels given annually by the Libertarian Futurist Society. American author and activist L. Neil Smith established the award in 1979, but it was not awarded regularly until the newly founded Libertarian Futurist Society revived it in 1982.  The Society created a Hall of Fame Award (for classic works of libertarian science fiction, not necessarily novels) in 1983, and also presents occasional one-off Special Awards.

Multiple recipients 
Some authors have won the award for best novel more than once:

Thrice
 Cory Doctorow
 Victor Koman
 Ken MacLeod
 L. Neil Smith

Twice
 Travis J I Corcoran
 James P. Hogan
 Neal Stephenson
 Vernor Vinge
 F. Paul Wilson
A few authors have won the Prometheus Hall of Fame award more than once:
 Poul Anderson
 Robert Heinlein
 George Orwell
 Ayn Rand
 F. Paul Wilson

Process 
Books published in a given year are eligible (although books from the last few months of the previous year are also eligible if it is felt that they have been overlooked).

 All members may nominate novels for the award.
 Members of the Best Novel Committee read at least 10–12 of the nominated novels and vote for a slate of 5 finalists.
 Full members (a higher price tier of membership) then vote on the finalists.

Step 2 happens in the first few months of the following year.

Step 3 happens in early summer of the following year.

The awards are given at the Annual Worldcon.

Prometheus Award winners and finalists
  *   Winners
  +   No winner selected

Hall of Fame Award inductees 
 1983: Robert A. Heinlein, The Moon Is a Harsh Mistress  |  Ayn Rand, Atlas Shrugged
 1984: George Orwell, Nineteen Eighty-Four  |  Ray Bradbury, Fahrenheit 451
 1985: Poul Anderson, Trader to the Stars  |  Eric Frank Russell, The Great Explosion
 1986: Cyril Kornbluth, The Syndic  |  Robert Anton Wilson / Robert Shea, Illuminatus! trilogy
 1987: Robert A. Heinlein, Stranger in a Strange Land  |  Ayn Rand, "Anthem"
 1988: Alfred Bester, The Stars My Destination
 1989: J. Neil Schulman, Alongside Night
 1990: F. Paul Wilson, The Healer
 1991: F. Paul Wilson, An Enemy of the State
 1992: Ira Levin, This Perfect Day
 1993: Ursula K. Le Guin, The Dispossessed
 1994: Yevgeny Zamyatin, We
 1995: Poul Anderson, The Star Fox
 1996: Robert A. Heinlein, Red Planet
 1997: Robert A. Heinlein, Methuselah's Children
 1998: Robert A. Heinlein, Time Enough for Love
 1999: H. Beam Piper / John J. McGuire, A Planet for Texans (also known as Lone Star Planet)
 2000: Hans Christian Andersen, "The Emperor's New Clothes"
 2001: Jerry Pournelle / John F. Carr (editors), The Survival of Freedom
 2002: Patrick McGoohan, The Prisoner (TV series)
 2003: Robert A. Heinlein, "Requiem"
 2004: Vernor Vinge, "The Ungoverned"
 2005: A. E. van Vogt, The Weapon Shops of Isher
 2006: Alan Moore (author) / David Lloyd (illustrator), V for Vendetta (graphic novel)
 2007: Sinclair Lewis, It Can't Happen Here  |  Vernor Vinge, True Names
 2008: Anthony Burgess, A Clockwork Orange
 2009: J. R. R. Tolkien, The Lord of the Rings
 2010: Poul Anderson, "No Truce with Kings"
 2011: George Orwell, Animal Farm
 2012: E. M. Forster, "The Machine Stops"
 2013: Neal Stephenson, Cryptonomicon
 2014: Lois McMaster Bujold, Falling Free
 2015: Harlan Ellison, "'Repent, Harlequin!' Said the Ticktockman"
 2016: Donald Kingsbury, Courtship Rite
 2017: Robert A. Heinlein, "Coventry"
 2018: Jack Williamson, "With Folded Hands"
 2019: Kurt Vonnegut, "Harrison Bergeron"
 2020: Poul Anderson, "Sam Hall"
 2021: F. Paul Wilson, "Lipidleggin'
 2022: Robert A. Heinlein, Citizen of the Galaxy

Special Award recipients
 1998: Brad Linaweaver and Edward E. Kramer: editors, Free Space (anthology)
 2001: Poul Anderson, Special Prometheus Award for Lifetime Achievement
 2005: Mark Tier and Martin H. Greenberg: editors, Give Me Liberty and Visions of Liberty (anthologies for Baen Books)
 2005: L. Neil Smith (writer) and Scott Bieser (illustrator), The Probability Broach: The Graphic Novel
 2006: Joss Whedon (writer-director), Serenity
 2007: James McTeigue (director) and the Wachowskis (screenplay), V for Vendetta (motion picture)
 2014: Vernor Vinge, Special Prometheus Award for Lifetime Achievement
 2014: Leslie Fish, Tower of Horses (novella) and "The Horsetamer's Daughter" (song)
 2015: F. Paul Wilson, Special Prometheus Award for Lifetime Achievement
 2016: L. Neil Smith, Special Prometheus Award for Lifetime Achievement
 2016: Jonathan Luna and Sarah Vaughn, Alex + Ada
 2017: Mark Stanley, Freefall (webcomic)

See also

 Anarcho-capitalist literature
 Libertarianism

References

External links
 Prometheus award page

Anarchist fiction
Awards established in 1979
Halls of fame in California
Libertarian science fiction
Science fiction awards